Sefton Park railway station is a disused station in Liverpool, England.

History 
The station opened on 1 June 1892. This followed the quadrupling of the line from Wavertree to Ditton Junction on 13 July 1891. The station had a substantial booking office at street level on the west side of the line and on the south side of Smithdown Road. A subway connected to four platforms situated on an embankment well above street level. The platforms had waiting facilities constructed of timber. The station came under the control of the station master at Mossley Hill and was staffed by a junior clerk and two porters. The station closed on 2 May 1960 shortly before the line was electrified due to low passenger numbers. Reports suggested that the station was losing £2,000 a year with an average of just 80 tickets a day being issued.

Nothing remains at track level but at street level the booking office can still be seen as it is in use as a paint shop.

There have been proposals to reopen the station, or create a new station further up the line on the bridge at Penny Lane, as the density of immediate population could support a station. However, there are no firm plans at present.

References

External links
Sefton Park railway station at Disused Stations

Disused railway stations in Liverpool
Railway stations in Great Britain opened in 1892
Railway stations in Great Britain closed in 1960
Former London and North Western Railway stations